Robert Frost: A Lover's Quarrel With the World is a 1963 American documentary film directed by Shirley Clarke and starring Robert Frost.

Summary
The poet's reflection on his life, career and philosophy of the world at his Vermont home and features footage of his lectures at Amherst and Sarah Lawrence College.

Accolades
It won the Academy Award for Best Documentary Feature for 1963.

Legacy
The Academy Film Archive preserved Robert Frost: A Lover's Quarrel with the World in 2006.

References

External links
 
 Robert Frost: A Lover's Quarrel with the World at WGBH OpenVault

Official site
Official trailer

1963 films
American documentary films
Black-and-white documentary films
Best Documentary Feature Academy Award winners
Films directed by Shirley Clarke
Documentary films about poets
1963 documentary films
Robert Frost
American black-and-white films
1960s English-language films
1960s American films